Olumuyiwa is a Nigerian name of Yoruba origin meaning "God, Lord, or the prominent one brought this".

Notable people with this name include:
 Olumuyiwa Aganun (born 1984), Nigerian footballer
 Olumuyiwa Benard Aliu (born 1960), Nigerian engineer
 Olumuyiwa Jibowu, (1899–1959), Nigerian jurist
 Oluwole Olumuyiwa (1929–2000), Nigerian architect

References

Yoruba given names
Yoruba-language surnames